Vermont is a state in the United States. Some of the state's bands include Secrecy, Block Party, RAQ, Blowtorch, Death, Phish, Twiddle, Madaila, Drowningman, Grace Potter and the Nocturnals, Noah Kahan, Mellow Yellow, 8084, Steady Betty, Rough Francis, Gang of Thieves, Waylon Speed, The Wards, The Cancer Conspiracy and Prydein. Burlington also has a thriving local music scene with artists like Eric George, Cricket Blue, Francesca Blanchard, the DuPont Brothers, Hannah Fair, Isabel Pless, and Addie Herbert.  The city also hosts jam bands, including the Jellies, Preserve, and Chutney Alice.

The state is also home to many iconoclastic composers, from Revolutionary-era Justin Morgan through electronic/avant-gardist Otto Luening. Vermont's contemporary composers includes Jon Appleton, Dennis Bathory-Kitsz, Henry Brant, Louis Calabro, Vivian Fine, David Gunn, Brian Johnson, Leroy Preston, Laura Koplewitz, John Levin, Peggy Madden, Erik Nielsen, Lionel Nowak, Thomas L. Read, Alan Shawn, Ernie Stires, GD, Su Lian Tan, Dennis Murphy, and Gwyneth Walker. Derrik Jordan is a composer and singer-songwriter, producer and multi-instrumentalist who plays 5 string electric violin, guitar, keyboard, kalimba and percussion. He is a recording artist on Worldsoul Records based in Putney, Vermont.

Vermont is also a source of folk and traditional music, with such musicians as Celia Woodsmith (and her band Avi & Celia,) Pete Sutherland, Anaïs Mitchell, Deb Flanders, Jon Gailmor, The Von Trapp Family, Angus Chaney, Patti Casey, Colin McCaffrey, Woods Tea Company, Hungrytown and many others.

Music education and institutions 
The Vermont Symphony Orchestra, founded in 1934, was the first state-funded orchestra in the nation. The orchestra's first artistic director was Alan Carter, followed by Efrain Guigui, Peter Brown, and Kate Tamarkin. The Artistic Director and conductor today is Jaime Laredo. Laredo is a world-renowned violinist who played for many years with Isaac Stern and performs worldwide as a soloist and frequently in duo concerts with Sharon Robinson, cellist. The VSO's  "Made in Vermont" series annually commissions a Vermont composer to create a large-scale work that tours the State. Previous recipients have included G. Walker, L. Koplewitz, et al. Current composer-in-residence with the VSO is David Ludwig. The Vermont Youth Orchestra has come to prominence since the mid-1990s under the direction of composer/conductor Troy Peters. The Consortium of Vermont Composers was formed in 1988 to promote composers of classical music from the state; the Consortium calls Vermont the "most composer-friendly state" in the country.

Vermont has a program entitled the Vermont MIDI Project, a non-profit program that encourages young students from elementary school to high school to compose music and submit what they have written to a biannual competition. If selected, the compositions are performed by the Vermont Symphony Orchestra. This program makes use of Sibelius notation software, which allows people to compose music electronically.

The Vermont College of Fine Arts in Montpelier houses a low-residency MFA program in music composition, where composers from all over the country gather every semester to study and perform.

Big Heavy World is a volunteer staffed music office, formed in 1996 to preserve and promote Vermont made music.

Girls Rock Vermont is a weeklong summer day camp for female and non binary kids aged 8–18.  The camp is run by musicians.  The campers form bands and perform at a showcase at Higher Ground at the end of the week.  GRVT is part of a larger Girls Rock Camp Alliance.

Music festivals 
The Vermont Mozart Festival, founded in 1974, is the state's largest classical music festival. As of 2006, the Mozart Festival has performed well over 2,000 works in over 30 locations, including 278 of Wolfgang Amadeus Mozart's 626 compositions—possibly more than any other festival or concert series in the country.

The Marlboro Music Festival has been held since 1950. There is also a Champlain Valley Folk Festival, the New World Festival held in Randolph and the One World, One Heart Festival, sponsored by local ice cream manufacturer Ben & Jerry's. The One World, One Heart Festival is held in Warren, Vermont and features concerts by folk and country performers.

The North Branch Bluegrass Festival, held annually since 2008 in Bridgewater, Vermont is an old-fashioned family music festival.  It features a weekend show of regional bluegrass musicians, music workshops, and weekend field camping.

See also
Indigenous music of North America#Eastern Woodlands

References

Notes

External links
Champlain Valley Folk Festival
New World Festival
Composer Laura Koplewitz

 
Vermont
Vermont culture
Vermont
Music scenes